List of replenishment ships of the Royal Fleet Auxiliary is a list of all replenishment ships of the British Royal Fleet Auxiliary.

Active

Tankers
Tide(II) class fast fleet tanker (2017)
  
 Tiderace
 Tidesurge
 Tideforce
Wave class fast fleet tanker (2003)
 Wave Knight
 Wave Ruler

Replenishment Ships

 Fort Victoria or Fort (II) class replenishment oiler (1994)
 Fort Victoria
 Fort Rosalie or Fort (I) class replenishment ship (1978)
 Fort Rosalie
 Fort Austin

Decommissioned

Tankers & oilers
Leaf class support tanker, Cammell Laird type (1979)
 Appleleaf
 Brambleleaf
 Bayleaf
 Oakleaf
 Orangeleaf
Leaf class support tanker, Sir James Laing type (1973)
Cherryleaf
Rover class small fleet tanker (1969)
Green Rover
Blue Rover
 Grey Rover
 Gold Rover
 Black Rover
Dale class mobile reserve tanker (1967)
Derwentdale
Dewdale
Ennerdale
Ol class large fleet tanker (1965)
Olmeda
Olna
Olwen
Tide (ii) class large fleet tanker (1963)
Tidespring
Tidepool
Leaf class support tanker, Blythswood Shipbuilding Company type (1960)
 Pearleaf
Leaf class support tanker, Blyth Drydock & Engineering Company type (1960)
 Plumleaf
Leaf class support tanker, Furness Shipbuilding Company type (1959)
Bayleaf
Brambleleaf
Orangeleaf
Leaf class support tanker, Bartram type (1959)
Appleleaf
Tide (i) class large fleet tanker (1955)
Tidereach
Tideflow
Tidesurge
Tide Austral
Eddy class coastal tanker (1953)
Eddybeach
Eddybay
Eddycliff
Eddycreek
Eddyrock
Eddyreef
Eddyfirth
Eddyness
Surf class oiler (1951)
Surf Patrol
Surf Pioneer
Ol class coastal tanker (1946)
Birchol
Oakol
Rowenol
Teakol
Fleet Tanker (1946)
Olna
Fast replenishment oiler (1945)
Northmark
Wave class oiler (1944)
Wave Baron
Wave Chief
Wave Emperor
Wave Governor
Wave Liberator
Wave Protector
Wave Regent
Wave Ruler
Wave Sovereign
Wave Victor
Wave King
Wave Monarch
Wave Duke
Wave Knight
Wave Laird
Wave Prince
Wave Protector
Wave Master
Wave Commander
Wave Conqueror
Ranger class small fleet tanker (1941)
Gold Ranger
Green Ranger
Grey Ranger
Black Ranger
Blue Ranger
Brown Ranger
Sprite class aviation spirits carrier (1941)
Airsprite
Nasprite
Dale class oiler (1940)
Dewdale
Darkdale
Derwentdale
Dingledale
Dinsdale
Denbydale
Eaglesdale
Easedale
Ennerdale
Echodale
Dale class oiler (1938)
Cairndale
Cedardale
Dale class oiler (1937)
Abbeydale
Aldersdale
Arndale
Bishopdale
Boardale
Broomdale
Ol class fleet tanker (1936)
Olcades
Oligarch
Olynthus
Olwen
Olna
Oleander
War class fleet oiler (1918)
War Afridi
War Bahadur
War Bharata
War Brahmin
War Diwan
War Gaekwar
War Ghurka
War Hindoo
War Jemadar
War Krishna
War Mehtar
War Nawab
War Nizam
War Pathan
War Pindari
War Rajah
War Ranee
War Sepoy
War Shikari
War Sirdar
War Subadar
War Sudra
Leaf class tankers (5,000 ton class) (1917)
Appleleaf
Brambleleaf
Cherryleaf
Orangeleaf
Pearleaf
Plumleaf
Leaf class tankers (1916)
Ashleaf
Aspenleaf
Bayleaf
Beechleaf
Birchleaf
Boxleaf
Briarleaf
Laureleaf
Limeleaf
Mapleleaf
Palmleaf
Roseleaf
Vineleaf
Dockleaf
Elmleaf
Fernleaf
Hollyleaf
Oakleaf
Ol class tankers (1918)
Dredgol
Ol class tankers (2000 ton class) (1917)
Belgol
Celerol
Fortol
Francol
Montenol
Prestol
Rapidol
Serbol
Slavol
Vitol
Ol class tankers (ex-Port of London Authority) (1916)
Barkol
Battersol
Blackol
Greenol
Purfol
Silverol
Ol class tankers (1000 ton class) (1916)
Birchol
Boxol
Creosol
Distol
Ebonol
Elderol
Elmol
Hickorol
Kimmerol
Larchol
Limol
Mixol
Oakol
Palmol
Philol
Scotol
Sprucol
Teakol
Viscol
Ol class tankers (1915)
Ferol
Collier and distilling ship (1915)
Hungerford
Fleet oiler (1915)
Nucula
Fleet oiler (1915)
Delphinula
Fleet oiler (1911)
Burma
Collier (1908)
Mercedes
Collier (tanker after 1907) (1901)
Kharki

Replenishment Ships

 Fort Victoria or Fort (II) class replenishment oiler (1994)
 Fort George
Regent class (1967)
Regent
Resource
Ness class (1966)
Lyness
Stromness
Tarbatness
Hebe class (1962)
Hebe
Bacchus
Air Stores Support Ship (1957)
Reliant
Retainer class (1954)
Retainer
Resurgent
Fort class (1944)
Fort Beauharnois
Fort Charlotte
Fort Constantine
Fort Dunvegan
Fort Duquesne
Fort Langley
Fort Rosalie
Fort Sandusky
Spa class coastal water carriers (1942)
Spa
Spabeck
Spabrook
Spaburn
Spalake
Spapool
Fresh class tank vessels
Freshbrook
Freshburn
Freshener
Freshet
Freshford
Freshlake
Freshmere
Freshpond
Freshpool
Freshspray
Freshspring
Freshtarn
Freshwater
Freshwell
Stores carrier (1941)
Demeter
Robert Dundas class coastal store carriers (1938)
Robert Dundas
Robert Middleton
Stores Support and Distilling Ship (1936)
Bacchus
Stores Carrier (1915)
Bacchus
Stores Carrier (1902)
Bison

Royal Fleet
Replenishment